Guanzhuang Township, is an rural township in Liling City, Zhuzhou City, Hunan Province, People's Republic of China.

Cityscape
The township is divided into 14 villages, the following areas: Changlian Village, Xinqiao Village, Ejin Village, Xiaoheng Village, Lichuan Village, Taohua Village, Xiaoyangkeng Village, Dayangkeng Village, Tantang Village, Dakouping Village, Waziping Village, Banbianshan Village, Daba Village, and Dahengjiang Village.

References

External links

Divisions of Liling